Amber Valley Borough Council elections are generally held three years out of every four, with a third of the council elected each time. Amber Valley Borough Council is the local authority for the non-metropolitan district of Amber Valley in Derbyshire, England. Since the last boundary changes in 2000, 45 councillors have been elected to represent 23 wards. New ward boundaries are due to come into force from the 2023 elections.

Political control
The first election to the council was held in 1973, initially operating as a shadow authority before coming into its powers on 1 April 1974. Since 1973 political control of the council has been held by the following parties:

Leadership
The leaders of the council since 2003 have been:

Council election results
The party make up of the council after each election is as shown below.

Council elections
1973 Amber Valley District Council election
1976 Amber Valley District Council election
1979 Amber Valley District Council election (New ward boundaries)
1980 Amber Valley District Council election
1982 Amber Valley District Council election
1983 Amber Valley District Council election
1984 Amber Valley District Council election
1986 Amber Valley District Council election (District boundary changes took place but the number of seats remained the same)
1987 Amber Valley District Council election
1988 Amber Valley District Council election
1990 Amber Valley Borough Council election
1991 Amber Valley Borough Council election
1992 Amber Valley Borough Council election
1994 Amber Valley Borough Council election (Borough boundary changes took place but the number of seats remained the same)
1995 Amber Valley Borough Council election
1996 Amber Valley Borough Council election
1998 Amber Valley Borough Council election
1999 Amber Valley Borough Council election
2000 Amber Valley Borough Council election (New ward boundaries increased the number of seats by two)
2002 Amber Valley Borough Council election
2003 Amber Valley Borough Council election
2004 Amber Valley Borough Council election
2006 Amber Valley Borough Council election
2007 Amber Valley Borough Council election
2008 Amber Valley Borough Council election
2010 Amber Valley Borough Council election
2011 Amber Valley Borough Council election
2012 Amber Valley Borough Council election
2014 Amber Valley Borough Council election
2015 Amber Valley Borough Council election
2016 Amber Valley Borough Council election
2018 Amber Valley Borough Council election
2019 Amber Valley Borough Council election
2021 Amber Valley Borough Council election
2022 Amber Valley Borough Council election

Borough result maps

By-election results

1994-2000

1997-2001

2000-2006

2006-2010

2010-2014

2014-2023

References

By-election results

External links
Amber Valley Council

 
Council elections in Derbyshire
Amber Valley
District council elections in England